Golfland Entertainment Centers are a chain of family amusement centers, miniature golf courses, and water parks located in California and Arizona. The company was founded in 1953.

Locations
"Milpitas Golfland" in Milpitas, California (1199 Jacklin Road)
"Camelot Golfland" in Anaheim, California (3200 East Carpenter Avenue)
"Emerald Hills Golfland" in San Jose, California (976 Blossom Hill Road)
"Golden Tee Golfland" in Castro Valley, California (2533 Castro Valley Boulevard)
Golfland Sunsplash in Mesa, Arizona (155 West Hampton Avenue)
"Golfland Sunsplash" in Roseville, California (1893 Taylor Road)
"Golfland USA" in Sunnyvale, California (855 East El Camino Real)

"Scandia Golfland" in Fairfield, California (4300 Central Place)

Former locations
Big Surf — Tempe, Arizona (sold to Inland Oceans LLC)
Waterworld — Phoenix, Arizona
Stockton Golfland — Stockton, California
Southern Hills Golfland — Stanton, California
Olathe Golfland — Olathe, Kansas

External links
 

1953 establishments in California
Miniature golf
Water parks in California